Byctiscus is a genus of beetles belonging to the family Attelabidae. Species of the genus are found in Europe and Japan.

Species
The following species are recognised in the genus Byctiscus:

 Byctiscus alni Reitter, 1888
 Byctiscus amurensis Voss, 1930
 Byctiscus angusticollis Legalov, 2007
 Byctiscus aureus Angelov, 1964
 Byctiscus betulae (C.Linnaeus, 1758)
 Byctiscus betuleti Motsch., 1860
 Byctiscus bilineatoides Legalov, 2007
 Byctiscus bilineatus Legalov, 2003
 Byctiscus chinensis Formanek, 1911
 Byctiscus cicatricosus Faust, 1890
 Byctiscus clavicornis Voss, 1935
 Byctiscus coerulans Voss, 1929
 Byctiscus coeruleata Voss, 1952
 Byctiscus collaris Voss, 1931
 Byctiscus complanatus Voss, 1933
 Byctiscus congener Fst., 1882
 Byctiscus congenerprinceps Schilsky, 1903
 Byctiscus cupreus Wasmann, 1887
 Byctiscus cuprifer Schilsky, 1903
 Byctiscus cuprinus Schilsky, 1903
 Byctiscus cyanicolor Voss, 1920
 Byctiscus davidiani Legalov, 2003
 Byctiscus davidis Faust, 1887
 Byctiscus destitutus Voss, 1930
 Byctiscus diversicolor Kolbe, 1886
 Byctiscus fausti Sharp, 1889
 Byctiscus formosanus Legalov, 2007
 Byctiscus foveostriatus Voss, 1930
 Byctiscus fukienensi Voss, 1949
 Byctiscus fulminans Voss, 1930
 Byctiscus gibbirostris Schilsky, 1906
 Byctiscus haroldi Roelofs, 1879
 Byctiscus himalayaensis Legalov, 2007
 Byctiscus hime Kono, 1929
 Byctiscus impressus Voss, 1930
 Byctiscus inermis Dalla Torre & Voss, 1937
 Byctiscus intermedius Voss, 1931
 Byctiscus kresli Legalov, 2003
 Byctiscus lacunipennis Voss, 1930
 Byctiscus lucidus Voss, 1931
 Byctiscus marina Voss, 1921
 Byctiscus morosus Voss, 1942
 Byctiscus motschulskyi Sharp, 1889
 Byctiscus moupinensis Legalov, 2007
 Byctiscus mutator Faust, 1890
 Byctiscus nigripes Faust, 1882
 Byctiscus nigritulus Schilsky, 1889
 Byctiscus nispinus Dalla Torre & Voss, 1937
 Byctiscus nitens Schilsky, 1903
 Byctiscus obscurecyaneus Faust, 1890
 Byctiscus obscuricuprea Voss, 1920
 Byctiscus omissus Voss, 1920
 Byctiscus parvulus Sharp, 1889
 Byctiscus patruelis Voss, 1922
 Byctiscus paviei Voss, 1921
 Byctiscus populi (C.Linnaeus, 1758)
 Byctiscus princeps Voss, 1943
 Byctiscus puberulus Voss, 1943
 Byctiscus regalis Kono, 1936
 Byctiscus regularis Voss, 1930
 Byctiscus reversus Sharp, 1889
 Byctiscus rugosus Voss, 1930
 Byctiscus sculpturatus Voss, 1930
 Byctiscus semicuprea Voss, 1930
 Byctiscus separandus Voss, 1930
 Byctiscus siamensis Legalov, 2007
 Byctiscus similaris Voss, 1920
 Byctiscus subauratus Voss, 1943
 Byctiscus subpectitus Voss, 1943
 Byctiscus subtilis Voss, 1930
 Byctiscus sumbaensis Voss, 1935
 Byctiscus tartaricus Faust, 1882
 Byctiscus thibetana Voss, 1933
 Byctiscus transbaikalia Voss, 1930
 Byctiscus transbaicalica Voss, 1930
 Byctiscus tsherskyi Suvorov, 1915
 Byctiscus venustus Sharp, 1889
 Byctiscus violaceus Voss, 1930
 Byctiscus viridis Dalla Torre & Voss, 1937
 Byctiscus viridulus Westh., 1882
 Byctiscus yunnanicus Voss, 1930

Gallery

References

Attelabidae